The Junior Oceania Cup is an international men's and women's under-21 field hockey competition organised by the Oceania Hockey Federation (OHF). It is held quadrennially to determine which teams will receive an automatic berth to the men's and women's Junior World Cups.

Australia are the most recent champions in both the men's and women's tournaments, defeating the national under-21 sides from New Zealand in each division.

Men's tournament

Summaries

Women's tournament

Summaries

References

International field hockey competitions in Oceania
Recurring sporting events established in 2000
2000 establishments in Oceania
Oceania Cup
Oceania Cup